Enrique Ernesto "Quique" Wolff (born 21 February 1949) is an Argentine journalist and former football defender. He represented Argentina at the 1974 World Cup.

Playing career 
Wolff, born in Victoria, Buenos Aires, began his career with Racing Club in 1967. He played for the club until he was transferred to River Plate in 1972.

In 1974 Wolff was transferred to UD Las Palmas in Spain, and 3 years later he joined Spanish giants Real Madrid where he was part of the championship winning sides of 1977-1978 and 1978-1979.

Wolff returned to Argentina in 1979 to play for Argentinos Juniors, but he only managed 8 appearances before retiring.
Two years after his retirement Wolff turned out for  Club Atlético Tigre in the Argentine 2nd division.

Sports Caster 
In 1992, he started a football-related television show named Simplemente Fútbol (Just football) in Argentina, which first aired locally, then moved to the Telefe network, where it was transmitted from 1993 to 1996. In 1998, the program moved to Fox Sports Americas. Since 2000, Simplemente Fútbol airs on ESPN Latin America.

Enrique Quique Wolff is it anchor announcers of SportsCenter on ESPN (South Cone) with Enrique Sacco in First Edition of SportsCenter (South Cone) from Monday to Friday at 13:00 (Local Time from Buenos Aires) at 11:00 (Local Time from Bogotá) and the 11:30 (Local Time from Caracas) live on ESPN +.

Honours 
 Racing Club
 Intercontinental Cup: 1967
 Real Madrid
 Liga de Primera División: 1977–78, 1978–79

References

External links

Official web site

1949 births
Living people
Sportspeople from Buenos Aires Province
Argentine footballers
Argentina international footballers
Argentine people of German descent
Argentine people of Portuguese descent
Association football defenders
Racing Club de Avellaneda footballers
Club Atlético River Plate footballers
La Liga players
Real Madrid CF players
UD Las Palmas players
Club Atlético Tigre footballers
Argentinos Juniors footballers
Argentine Primera División players
Argentine expatriate footballers
1974 FIFA World Cup players